David Biddle (born 10 August 1985) was a Canadian rugby union player. His playing position was flanker. He was named in the Canada squad for the 2007 Rugby World Cup, making 3 appearances in the tournament. His World Cup appearances would be the final of his six international appearances before returning to his studies.

Reference list

External links
itsrugby.co.uk profile

1985 births
Canadian rugby union players
Canada international rugby union players
Living people
Rugby union flankers